The Central Institute London, was established in 1989. Its role was to encourage the use of academic dress and to encourage excellence in the execution of academic ceremonial; to this end, it assigned academic dress to its own members. Membership was based on the academic degrees or professional qualifications held by members, and also included Honorary Life Member (HonCIL) and Companion (CompCIL) as honorary awards, Companion being the highest award and limited to a maximum of one new Companion per year. In the sixteen years of the Institute's existence, there were only three elected CompCIL:

Professor Colin Parsons
Professor Ian Tracey
Dr Maurice Merrell

Due to falling membership numbers, its activities were permanently suspended in 2005 and members encouraged to join The Burgon Society.

Academic dress
Educational organisations based in London
Learned societies of the United Kingdom
History organisations based in the United Kingdom
1999 establishments in England
Organizations established in 1999